John Robertson (1875 – 5 August 1952) was a New Zealand politician of the Labour Party.

Biography

Early life
Robertson was born in Scotland, and was a watchmaker by trade. Interested in politics early, he joined the Social Democratic Federation. He was then in 1893 a foundation member of the Independent Labour Party in Britain. In 1895 he became Secretary of the party, the youngest man to hold the job. He emigrated to New Zealand in 1902. He settled in Dunedin and continued his trade as a watchmaker until moving to Palmerston North in 1910.

In 1920 he entered the film trade as the manager of the Crystal Palace Theatre in Christchurch. Upon the formation of the New Zealand Motion Picture Exhibitors' Association in 1927 he became its national secretary. He was in addition a member of both the Government Film Advisory Committee and the New Zealand Film Industry Board.

Political career

He represented the Otaki electorate from 1911, when he was elected on the second ballot with Reform Party support, having been nominated by the flax-workers union. He stood Labour Party. though was also endorsed by the New Zealand Socialist Party.

Robertson was the only sitting Labour MP who supported the formation of the Social Democratic Party in 1913 and joined the party. He ran for re-election in Otaki in 1914, but he was defeated by William Hughes Field of the Reform Party. During the 1914 election, Robertson was the Social Democrat's representative in distributing servicemen's votes as he was their most senior MP at the time.

In 1933 he stood unsuccessfully for a seat on the Wellington City Council on the Labour Party ticket.

After he lost his seat in parliament he stood for Mayor of Masterton as Labour's candidate, but was defeated by William Kemp.

He was then appointed to the Legislative Council on 31 January 1946 and served until its abolition on 31 December 1950. He was then an active member of the Miramar branch of the Labour Party.

Death
He died in Wellington aged 76 on 5 August 1952. He was survived by his wife, son and daughter.

Notes

References

|-

1875 births
1952 deaths
Scottish watchmakers (people)
Film exhibitors
New Zealand left-wing activists
New Zealand Labour Party MPs
Members of the New Zealand Legislative Council
Scottish emigrants to New Zealand
New Zealand Labour Party MLCs
Unsuccessful candidates in the 1943 New Zealand general election
Unsuccessful candidates in the 1914 New Zealand general election
Unsuccessful candidates in the 1919 New Zealand general election
Members of the New Zealand House of Representatives
New Zealand MPs for North Island electorates
Social Democratic Party (New Zealand) MPs
New Zealand Labour Party (1910) MPs